The 1967 California Angels season involved the Angels finishing 5th in the American League with a record of 84 wins and 77 losses, 7½ games behind the AL Champion Boston Red Sox.

Offseason 
 October 18, 1966: Jimmy Piersall was released by the California Angels.
 November 28, 1966: Ramón Hernández was drafted from the Angels by the Atlanta Braves in the 1966 rule 5 draft.
 November 29, 1966: Mike White and Don Furnald (minors) were traded by the Angels to the Chicago Cubs for Chris Krug and Wayne Schurr.
 December 2, 1966: The Angels traded Dean Chance and a player to be named later to the Minnesota Twins for Don Mincher, Jimmie Hall, and Pete Cimino. The Angels completed the deal by sending Jackie Hernández to the Twins on April 10, 1967.
 December 14, 1966: Norm Siebern was traded by the Angels to the San Francisco Giants for Len Gabrielson.

Regular season 
The 1967 Angels broke from the past, trading their ace pitcher and 1964 Cy Young Award winner Dean Chance to the Twins. In exchange, they obtained power hitting first baseman Don Mincher. Mincher would be their first legitimate consistent power threat since Leon Wagner was traded after the 1963 season. The Angels also obtained outfielder Jimmie Hall, who had averaged 25 home runs per season for the Twins from 1963–66. The Angels counted on young pitchers Jim McGlothlin and Rickey Clark to pick up the slack for the departed Chance.
  
The 1967 Angels had the second best record in franchise history to date and ranked a franchise best to date 4th in the American League in attendance. Mincher chipped in 25 homers and Hall added 16 in 129 games. Former bonus baby Rick Reichardt finally started showing promise by batting .265 with 17 homers, while shortstop Jim Fregosi had another solid season, batting .290 and earning a Gold Glove. Second baseman Bobby Knoop also won a Gold Glove, and the Angels led the league in fielding percentage. The pitching staff was led by McGlothlin, who was named to the AL All-Star team, along with Clark and hard luck veteran George Brunet, who lost 19 games despite a 3.31 ERA. Relief pitcher Minnie Rojas had a remarkable season, with a league-leading 27 saves, winning 12 games in relief, and sporting a 2.52 ERA.

Season summary 
The Angels, coming off an 80–82 record in 1966, started slowly. On May 31, they were 18–27 and 10 games out of first place. At that point, they began to jell, and after going 20–11 in June and 17–11 in July, they found themselves at 55–49. While this put them in fifth place, they were only 4½ games out of first in what had become a five-team race between the Angels, Minnesota Twins, Detroit Tigers, Chicago White Sox, and the surprising Boston Red Sox.

On August 13, the Angels completed a 3-game sweep of the Red Sox. They were now only 1½ games out of first as they embarked on a crucial road trip that included stops in Minnesota and Boston. The Angels lost 3 games to the Twins, and 3 games in Boston (in one of which Boston's Tony Conigliaro was severely beaned and almost killed by the Angels' Jack Hamilton). When they returned home, the Angels lost 3 out of 4 to the Tigers, and they entered September only 1 game over .500 and 8 games out of first.

They played well in September, going 17–11 to finish 84–77, but never got closer than 6 games out of first. However, they had a big influence on the tight American League pennant race as they beat the Tigers in Detroit in the last game of the season, enabling the Red Sox to win the pennant by 1 game.

Opening Day lineup 
 José Cardenal, CF
 Jim Fregosi, SS
 Rick Reichardt, LF
 Don Mincher, 1B
 Jimmie Hall, RF
 Bobby Knoop, 2B
 Buck Rodgers, C
 Paul Schaal, 3B
 George Brunet, P

Season standings

Record vs. opponents

Notable transactions 
 April 10, 1967: Jimmy Piersall was signed as a free agent by the Angels.
 May 6, 1967: Cotton Nash and cash were traded by the Angels to the Chicago White Sox for Bill Skowron.
 May 12, 1967: Jimmy Piersall was released by the Angels.
 June 8, 1967: Chris Krug was released by the Angels.
 June 15, 1967: Marcelino López and Tom Arruda (minors) were traded by the Angels to the Baltimore Orioles for Woodie Held.
 August 7, 1967: The Angels sent a player to be named later to the Houston Astros for Jim Weaver. The Angels completed the deal by sending Héctor Torres to the Astros on November 21.

Roster

Player stats

Batting

Starters by position 
Note: Pos = Position; G = Games played; AB = At bats; H = Hits; Avg. = Batting average; HR = Home runs; RBI = Runs batted in

Other batters 
Note: G = Games played; AB = At bats; H = Hits; Avg. = Batting average; HR = Home runs; RBI = Runs batted in

Pitching

Starting pitchers 
Note: G = Games pitched; IP = Innings pitched; W = Wins; L = Losses; ERA = Earned run average; SO = Strikeouts

Other pitchers 
Note: G = Games pitched; IP = Innings pitched; W = Wins; L = Losses; ERA = Earned run average; SO = Strikeouts

Relief pitchers 
Note: G = Games pitched; W = Wins; L = Losses; SV = Saves; ERA = Earned run average; SO = Strikeouts

Awards and honors 
AL All-Stars
 Jim Fregosi
 Jim McGlothlin
 Don Mincher

Gold Glove Award
 Jim Fregosi, SS
 Bobby Knoop, 2B

Farm system 

LEAGUE CHAMPIONS: San Jose

Notes

References 
1967 California Angels team at Baseball Reference
1967 California Angels team page at www.baseball-almanac.com

Los Angeles Angels seasons
California Angels season
Los